The Cleeton gas field and hub is a natural gas production, gathering, compression, treatment and transportation facility in the southern North Sea, 54 km east of Flamborough Head, Yorkshire. It has been producing and transmitting gas since 1988.

The Cleeton gas field 
The Cleeton gas field, in UK Block 42/29, was discovered in April 1983. Cleeton was one of the 'Villages' gas fields; named after villages lost to the sea along the Holderness coast. These villages include: Cleeton, Dimlington, Hoton, Hyde, Newsham and Ravenspurn.

The reservoir is a Permian Lower Leman Sandstone Formation, estimated to have gas reserves of 280 billion cubic feet. The reservoir was produced from wells drilled from the Cleeton Wellhead tower, CW. From CW gas, and associated condensate, flowed to the bridge-linked main platform, CPQ. Here it was treated in 3-phase separators, gas dehydration, condensate coalescers and produced water treatment plant. As wellhead pressures declined so gas was compressed on the compression platform, CC, installed in 1995. Treated gas and condensate was sent to Dimlington gas terminal via the 36-inch pipeline. The production profile, in million cubic metres per year (mcm/y), of the Cleeton field was as follows.

The Cleeton field was shutdown as unproductive in 1999. The cumulative total of gas produced since 1988 was 10,268 mcm.

Other developments 
In addition to the Cleeton offshore facilities a new gas terminal was built at Dimlington to receive and treat the gas prior to shipment into the National Transmission System.

The Ravenspurn gas field was being developed and from 1989 gas was routed to Cleeton for treatment, if required, and to Dimlington via the 36-inch pipeline.

The Easington Catchment Area project was instigated in the late 1990s. A bridge-linked ECA riser tower (CT) was installed at Cleeton to receive gas from the ECA development. Gas was processed on Cleeton CPQ as required and was transmitted to Dimlington.

The Cleeton field was originally owned and operated by Britoil/BP, Perenco assumed ownership in 2012.

Cleeton platforms 
The Cleeton hub comprised the following bridge-linked platforms:

Cleeton pipelines 
The following pipelines were connected to the Cleeton hub.

See also 

 Easington gas terminal
 Arthurian gas fields
 Planets gas fields
 Ravenspurn gas fields
 Easington Catchment Area 
 List of oil and gas fields of the North Sea

References 

Natural gas fields in the United Kingdom
North Sea energy